Jordanhill Rugby Football Club is a former rugby union football club based in Glasgow, Scotland. Founded as a club for the students and former students of Jordanhill College, it lasted until 1988 when it merged with Hillhead RFC to form Hillhead Jordanhill RFC.

Jordanhill College

Jordanhill College was planned in 1913 as a teacher training college. On the outbreak of the First World War, the building of the campus was delayed but Jordanhill School was completed in 1920 and the teaching college was completed in 1921.

Rugby

A rugby team, Jordanhill College RFC, was formed. The club used the campus grounds at Southbrae Drive in Jordanhill for their matches. Jordanhill College School FP RFC played their matches at Kilmardinny in Bearsden and Victoria Park, Jordanhill.

Jordanhill v Gordonians 13 November 1965 match report

Merger

The club was merged with Hillhead RFC (formerly the rugby club of the former pupils of Hillhead High School) in 1988 to form Hillhead Jordanhill RFC.

Club Honours

 Scottish Unofficial Championship
 Champions (1): 1969
 Glasgow City Sevens
 Champions (3): 1952, 1953, 1954
 Allan Glen's Sevens
 Champions: 1975, 1979
 Lenzie Sevens
 Champions: 1969, 1973
 Hillhead HSFP Sevens
 Champions: 1976
 Glasgow University Sevens
 Champions: 1974
 Kilmarnock Sevens
 Champions: 1954
 Ayr Sevens
 Champions: 1982
 Hyndland Sevens
 Champions: 1969

Notable former players

Former coaches

  Bill Dickinson, Scotland national rugby union coach, 1971–77.
 Richie Dixon, Scotland national rugby union coach 1995–98, Glasgow Warriors Head Coach 1999-2002
 Hugh Campbell, Glasgow Warriors Head Coach 2003-06

Scotland internationalists

Glasgow District players

References

External links
 Playing Rugby for Jordanhill College Rugby Football Club 1958 - 1966 John Henderson ‘The Boot’ Remembers

Scottish rugby union teams
Rugby union in Glasgow
Sports teams in Glasgow
Defunct Scottish rugby union clubs
Rugby union clubs disestablished in 1988
1988 disestablishments in Scotland
Rugby clubs established in 1921
1921 establishments in Scotland
Jordanhill